Scaphella dohrni, commonly known as the Dohrn's volute is a species of sea snail, a marine gastropod mollusk in the family Volutidae, the volutes.

Description

Distribution
This species occurs in the Gulf of Mexico and off Florida.

References

 Bail, P & Poppe, G. T. 2001. A conchological iconography: a taxonomic introduction of the recent Volutidae. Hackenheim-Conchbook, 30 pp, 5 pl.
 Rosenberg, G., F. Moretzsohn, and E. F. García. 2009. Gastropoda (Mollusca) of the Gulf of Mexico, pp. 579–699 in Felder, D.L. and D.K. Camp (eds.), Gulf of Mexico–Origins, Waters, and Biota. Biodiversity. Texas A&M Press, College Station, Texas.

Volutidae
Gastropods described in 1903